Háng Lìa is a commune (xã) and village of the Điện Biên Đông District of Điện Biên Province, northwestern Vietnam. It lies to the southeast of Điện Biên Đông town. The commune covers an area of 65.63 square kilometres and has a reported population of 2336.

References

Communes of Điện Biên province
Populated places in Điện Biên province